The African black shrew (Crocidura nigrofusca) is a species of shrew. It is native to Africa, where it is widespread. Other common names include tenebrous shrew. This shrew can be found in several types of lower-elevation moist tropical forest habitat.

References 

Crocidura
Mammals described in 1895
Taxonomy articles created by Polbot